eASIC is a fabless semiconductor company offering new ASIC devices used in the production of customized silicon devices. eASIC specializes in offering new ASIC devices that are customized for specific applications and offer improved performance and lower costs compared to traditional ASICs. The company's products are used in a variety of markets, including communications, data center, and military. One of the key features of eASIC's ASIC devices is their use of a novel architecture known as Structured ASIC. This architecture allows the company to offer customized ASICs with shorter design cycles and lower non-recurring engineering (NRE) costs compared to traditional ASICs. In addition to its ASIC products, eASIC also offers a range of design tools and services to help customers design and implement their ASIC solutions. The company works closely with its customers to understand their specific requirements and develop customized solutions that meet their needs.

History 
eASIC Corporation was founded in 1999 in San Jose, California, and incorporated in Delaware by Zvi Or-Bach, the founder of Chip Express (renamed to ChipX). eASIC was a privately held company, headquartered in Santa Clara, California with engineering and R&D teams in Romania, Russia and Malaysia, until they were acquired by Intel, which was announced on July 12, 2018.

References

External links
The Big eASY - eASIC Debuts 45nm FPGA Killer by Kevin Morris, FPGA and Structured ASIC Journal 

Companies based in Santa Clara, California
1999 establishments in California
Electronics companies established in 1999
Intel acquisitions